The National Youth Orchestra of Iraq (NYOI) is a youth orchestra comprising musicians from different parts of Iraq. The members are aged between 14 and 29 years. They are selected every autumn-winter through a process of online and video auditions.

The National Youth Orchestra of Iraq

The National Youth Orchestra of Iraq is the brainchild of Zuhal Sultan at 17 years of age. She worked with Raw Television on their award-winning Battlefront series of Generation Y leaders during 2008/9 to create the orchestra.

In September 2008, Raw TV sent out a press release entitled "Iraqi Teen seeks Maestro for Youth Orchestra" to UK press, which Scottish Conductor, Paul MacAlindin, read and responded to. After choosing Paul as musical director, Zuhal brought in friend and fellow musician, Allegra Klein, Director of Musicians for Harmony in New York. Together, they worked online to set up the first summer course for 2009.

Auditions by YouTube were organised with players in Baghdad and the Kurdish Region of Iraq. Funding was secured from the Baghdad and Kurdish governments, as well as the British Council and Foreign and Commonwealth Office of Great Britain. The British Council, at that time directed by Tony Reilly, also became the operational partner in Iraq.

Courses

The orchestra meets once a year in a two- week summer course. For the second year in a row, the course has been held in the Kurdish Region of Iraq. The course includes intensive training by European and American professional musicians, providing an opportunity for the talented musicians to receive group lessons as well as one to one as most of the members have had little tuition or have been self-taught. The course includes ice-breaking and bonding sessions between members and tutors.

See also
Official website run by German charitable association Förderverein Nationales Jugendorchester des Irak e.V. – "JOI"
 Iraqi National Symphony Orchestra
 Zuhal Sultan
Musicians For Harmony
 List of youth orchestras

References 
https://web.archive.org/web/20160305080922/https://vimeo.com/7222431
https://web.archive.org/web/20091208190127/http://www.britishcouncil.org/new/about-us/Creating-opportunity-worldwide/Iraqs-first-ever-National-Youth-Orchestra/
https://www.facebook.com/NYO.IRAQ
http://wn.com/National_Youth_Orchestra_of_Iraq,_BBC_Reporting_Scotland

National youth orchestras
Youth organizations based in Iraq
Iraqi orchestras